Andy Warhol's Pork (also known as Pork) is the first and only play by Andy Warhol. It was directed by Anthony Ingrassia, produced by Ira Gale, and stage-managed by Leee Black Childers.  Pork opened on May 5, 1971, at La MaMa Experimental Theatre in New York City for a two-week run. It was brought to the Roundhouse in London for a six-week run in August 1971.  

Pork was based on tape-recorded conversations between Brigid Berlin and Warhol during which Brigid would play for Warhol tapes she had made of phone conversations between herself and her mother, socialite Honey Berlin.   

The play featured Jayne County as "Vulva," Cherry Vanilla as "Amanda Pork," Tony Zanetta as a Warhol-analogue called B. Marlowe, Geri Miller as Josie, Cleve Roller, Julia Breck, and Suzanne Smith. Other cast members included the "Pepsodent Twins" who, according to Jayne County, represented Warhol's boyfriend Jed Johnson and his twin brother, Jay Johnson. According to a review of the London production, "[Amanda] Pork is estranged from her husband and attended by the Pepsodent twins, two boys alike only in their nudity and their pastel powdered genitals."  

Reviewing Pork for The New York Times, journalist Grace Glueck wrote, "All in all, it's a cozy bunch; take out the fornication, masturbation, defecation and prevarication with which 'Pork' is larded and you might have a certain similarity to the juvenile gang in 'You're a Good Man, Charlie Brown.'"

In London, the production caused a scandal. Geri Miller exposed her breast during a photo session in front of the Queen Mother's house and got arrested.

David Bowie, who saw the play, later hired several of the Pork cast members to join his management firm MainMan.

References 

1971 plays
American plays

Andy Warhol
Nudity in theatre and dance